We Hate You South African Bastards! was the second album by the Irish band Microdisney.  It was re-issued on CD with the title Love Your Enemies to reflect post-Apartheid South Africa. The album consists of early recordings of Microsdisney before they moved from Cork to London.

The cover art was designed by the Welsh musician and artist Jon Langford, a founding member of The Mekons and The Three Johns.

Track listing
All tracks composed by Cathal Coughlan and Sean O'Hagan
 "Helicopter of the Holy Ghost" (3:53)
 "Michael Murphy" (2:08)
 "Love Your Enemies" (3:12)
 "Fiction Land" (2:28)
 "Pink Skinned Man" (4:08)
 "Patrick Moore Says You Can't Sleep Here" (2:23)
 "Hello Rascals" (2:46)
 "Pretoria Quickstep" (4:50)
 "Loftholdingswood" (5:30)
 "Teddy Dogs" (3:28)
 "464" (5:58)
9-11 are CD bonus tracks, taken from the 12" EP In the World, released in 1985 by Rough Trade.

References

Sources
 Young, Rob. Rough Trade. Black Dog Publishing, 

1984 compilation albums
Microdisney albums
Rough Trade Records compilation albums